Femi Taylor  (born 8 April 1961) is a Niger-born British dancer and actress best known for portraying Jabba the Hutt's Twi'lek slave dancer Oola in the 1983 motion picture Return of the Jedi.

Career

Taylor portrayed the slave dancer Oola in Return of the Jedi, the last film of the original trilogy. She reprised the part fourteen years later, filming new scenes for the 1997 Special Edition release, and was the only performer from the original to do so. Because of this role, she appears at science fiction and Star Wars conventions around the world.

Taylor was cast as Tantomile in the 1981 original London production of the musical Cats, during which she learned she had been cast as Oola for Return of the Jedi. She appeared in the 1998 TV movie version of Cats as Exotica, a character that was created specially for her and exclusively for the film.

Personal life
Taylor lives in Odense, Denmark, has two children and is married to Claus Skytte Kamper.

Filmography

Film

Television

References

External links

TheForce.Net - Interview with Femi Taylor
2021 interview

Living people
British film actresses
English female dancers
Nigerian female dancers
Place of birth missing (living people)
Nigerian emigrants to the United Kingdom
British emigrants to Denmark
Yoruba actresses
20th-century British actresses
Black British actresses
1961 births
20th-century English women
20th-century English people
Nigerian film actresses